Isanti is a city in Isanti County, Minnesota, United States. The population was 6,804 at the 2020 census. The name Isanti is composed of two Dakota words: isan ("knife") and ati ("camp"), and refers to the Santee Dakota people.

Minnesota State Highway 65 and Isanti County Road 5 are the main routes in Isanti.

Geography
The Rum River flows through Isanti's western edge.

Demographics

2010 census
As of the census of 2010, there were 5,251 people, 1,871 households, and 1,336 families living in the city. The racial makeup of the city was 94.7% White, 1.1% African American, 0.5% Native American, 0.7% Asian, 0.7% from other races, and 2.2% from two or more races. Hispanic or Latino of any race were 2.8% of the population.

There were 1,871 households, of which 48.0% had children under the age of 18 living with them, 49.9% were married couples living together, 13.0% had a female householder with no husband present, 8.6% had a male householder with no wife present, and 28.6% were non-families. 20.6% of all households were made up of individuals, and 6.3% had someone living alone who was 65 years of age or older. The average household size was 2.81 and the average family size was 3.23.

The median age in the city was 28.4 years. 32.8% of residents were under the age of 18; 8.4% were between the ages of 18 and 24; 36.9% were from 25 to 44; 15.4% were from 45 to 64; and 6.5% were 65 years of age or older. The gender makeup of the city was 50.4% male and 49.6% female.

2000 census
As of the census of 2000, there were 2,324 people, 816 households, and 576 families living in the city. The racial makeup of the city was 97.46% White, 0.56% African American, 0.65% Native American, 0.26% Asian, 0.04% Pacific Islander, 0.09% from other races, and 0.95% from two or more races. Hispanic or Latino of any race were 0.90% of the population.

There were 816 households, out of which 48.7% had children under the age of 18 living with them, 49.6% were married couples living together, 16.2% had a female householder with no husband present, and 29.3% were non-families. 22.8% of all households were made up of individuals, and 8.5% had someone living alone who was 65 years of age or older.  The average household size was 2.84 and the average family size was 3.31.

In the city, the population was spread out, with 35.8% under the age of 18, 9.6% from 18 to 24, 35.3% from 25 to 44, 11.8% from 45 to 64, and 7.6% who were 65 years of age or older.  The median age was 28 years. For every 100 females, there were 97.8 males.  For every 100 females age 18 and over, there were 85.5 males.

The median income for a household in the city was $43,587, and the median income for a family was $46,842. Males had a median income of $35,590 versus $25,081 for females. The per capita income for the city was $16,662.  About 7.9% of families and 8.0% of the population were below the poverty line, including 9.9% of those under age 18 and 16.4% of those age 65 or over.

Sports
The Minnesota Owls was a Tier III junior hockey team based in Isanti. It played in the Minnesota Junior Hockey League for over 20 seasons.

Infrastructure

Transportation
  Minnesota State Highway 65
  Isanti County Road 5
  Isanti County Road 23

Notable people
 Grace McCallum, Olympian

References

External links

Cities in Minnesota
Cities in Isanti County, Minnesota
Dakota toponyms